General Anthropology is an anthropology journal edited by Dave McCurdy  and Patricia C. Rice.  It is published in May and November by Wiley-Blackwell for the General Anthropology Division of the American Anthropological Association.  It publishes information in the fields of anthropology and applied anthropology.

References

Anthropology journals
Publications established in 1994
English-language journals
Biannual journals
Wiley-Blackwell academic journals